Becky Peak Wilderness is a  wilderness area in White Pine County, in the U.S. state of Nevada.  Located north of the town of Mcgill, the Wilderness was created by the White Pine County Conservation, Recreation and Development Act of 2006 and is administered by the U.S. Bureau of Land Management.

Located at the northern end of the Schell Creek Range, vegetation in the Wilderness consists primarily of desert brush and grass at the lower elevations and a scattering of pinyon pine and juniper stands on the upland slopes of Becky Peak and surrounding hillsides.

See also 

 List of wilderness areas in Nevada
 List of U.S. Wilderness Areas
 Wilderness Act

References

External links 
 Becky Peak Wilderness Area - BLM page
 

Wilderness areas of Nevada
Protected areas of White Pine County, Nevada
Bureau of Land Management areas in Nevada
Protected areas established in 2006
2006 establishments in Nevada